David Sassoon may refer to:

David Sassoon (designer) (born 1932), British fashion designer
David Sassoon (treasurer) (1792–1864), Iraqi-Jewish treasurer
David Solomon Sassoon (1880–1942), Iraqi bibliophile

See also
Sassoon family
Albert Abdullah David Sassoon (1818–1896), English businessman
David Sasson, Israeli diplomat
David of Sassoun, a fictional character in the Armenian war poem Daredevils of Sassoun
Frederick David Sassoon (1853–1917), English merchant
Reuben David Sassoon (1835–1905), English merchant
Solomon David Sassoon (1915–1985), English educator
Solomon David Sassoon (1841–1894), (1841–1894), English businessman
Sassoon David Sassoon (1831–1867), English businessman